"Mal de Amores" is a song by Mexican singer Sofía Reyes and American singer Becky G. The song was released on September 10, 2021 by Warner Music Latina as the lead single of Reyes's second studio album of the same name.

Music video
The music video was released alongside the song on September 10. The music video was directed by Mike Ho.

Charts

Weekly charts

Year-end charts

Certifications

References

2021 singles
2021 songs
Sofía Reyes songs
Becky G songs
Spanish-language songs
Songs written by Becky G
Songs written by Elena Rose
Warner Music Latina singles
Songs written by Andrés Torres (producer)
Songs written by Mauricio Rengifo